Lincoln University is a private university in Oakland, California. 

It enrolls over 500 students in undergraduate and graduate level programs in business administration, as well an English language program, certificate programs, and bachelor of science degrees.

History
Named to honor the life and work of President Abraham Lincoln, Lincoln University was founded and chartered under the laws of California in 1926. The first university officers were Benjamin Franklin Lickey, president, and Edward J. Silver, vice president and educational director. Lickey with his wife Susan had in 1919 founded a law study program in San Francisco for veterans returning after the First World War and other working adults which offered evening classes to part-time students while he was working as the western representative of the Law Department of the La Salle Extension University of Chicago which offered degrees through correspondence courses. The program developed into a tutorial center with a broader curriculum. One of its early slogans was "The Shortcut to Success" and it offered "reasonable terms" and a "money-back guarantee."

By 1927 Lincoln University was operating on the Arcade Floor of the Phelan Building on Market Street in San Francisco with Colleges of Law and Commerce and a Department of Special Courses and Coaching, offering both day and evening classes as a co-educational institution. 

An advertisement of that year showed Lincoln University offering college courses in law, commerce, foreign trade, and business administration and special courses and coaching in bar examination preparation, advertising, journalism, and public speaking. It also maintained a junior college and high school program which operated a preparatory school and special preparation for College Board examinations. At this time Lickey served as president of Lincoln University while continuing as the agent of LaSalle Extension University.

Its nonprofit status was recognized by the Internal Revenue Service in 1950 and in 1961 a second campus was opened in San Jose. By 1987 the San Jose campus had become the location of the university's law school programs. It separated in 1993 to become the independent Lincoln Law School of San Jose. The university moved from San Francisco to Oakland in December 1999.

Lincoln University was featured in a March 2011 Chronicle of Higher Education article entitled “Little-Known Colleges Exploit Visa Loopholes to Make Millions Off Foreign Students.”

Academics

Lincoln University offers the following degree programs:
Master of Business Administration
Master of Science
Bachelor of Arts
Bachelor of Science

Accreditation
Lincoln University is accredited by WASC Senior College and University Commission (WSCUC). 

Lincoln University has received accreditation for its graduate business programs through the International Accreditation Council for Business Education (IACBE). Membership Status: Accredited Member.

Lincoln University is accredited by the Accrediting Council for Independent Colleges and Schools (ACICS) since 1990, to award master's and bachelor's degrees. Their accreditation status is listed as "Compliance Warning".

The California Bureau for Private Postsecondary Education in accordance with the provisions of former California Education Code sections 94900 and/or 94915 approved Lincoln University to offer the Doctor of Business Administration,  Master of Business Administration, Master of Science in Finance Management, Master of Science in International Business, Bachelor of Arts in Business Administration, and Bachelor of Science in Diagnostic Imaging degrees.

It is on the U.S. Department of Education's Federal Student Aid (FSA) "List of Institutions on Heightened Cash Monitoring as of December 1, 2019." The U.S. Department of Education may place institutions on a Heightened Cash Monitoring (HCM) payment method to provide additional oversight of cash management. Heightened Cash Monitoring is a step that FSA can take with institutions to provide additional oversight for a number of financial or federal compliance issues, some of which may be serious and others that may be less troublesome. The list notes "severe findings" for Lincoln University.

Affiliation
Lincoln University is an institutional member of the Council for Higher Education Accreditation (CHEA), CHEA International Quality Group (CIQG), the American Association of Collegiate Registrars and Admissions Officers (AACRAO),  the National Association of Foreign Student Advisers (NAFSA), the Institute of International Education (IIE), the American Association for Higher Education (AAHE), and the National Association of Independent Colleges and Universities (NAICU); it is affiliated also with the California Association of Private Postsecondary Schools (CAPPS).

References

External links
Official website

Education in Oakland, California
Universities and colleges in Alameda County, California
Educational institutions established in 1926
1926 establishments in California
Private universities and colleges in California